12 Girls Band (sometimes abbreviated to 女樂 or 女乐) are an all female Chinese musical group that initially consisted of twelve members before the addition of a thirteenth. Twelve Girls Band use traditional Chinese instruments to play both traditional Chinese and Western music. Formed on June 18, 2001, the women were selected by audition from more than 4,000 contestants. Each woman is classically trained, and the band members come from various conservatories in the People's Republic of China (PRC), including the China Academy of Music, the Chinese National Orchestra, and the Central Conservatory of Music.

History
Chinese numerology gave Wang Xiao-Jing the idea for the Twelve Girls Band. When Xiao-Jing decided he wanted to create a female ensemble, he knew it needed 12 members. Per Chinese mythology it is the twelve jinchai (12 hairpins) representing womanhood. For the new project, the women were inspired by the art of the Yue Fang, the ensembles who played in the Tang dynasty courts during the years A.D. 618 to 907.

The group debuted their modern compositions on ancient instruments in China and Japan during the Northern summer of 2003. In Japan their debut album topped the charts for 30 weeks. Their debut album, entitled "Eastern Energy," was released in North America in August 2004 with cover versions of Coldplay's "Clocks" and Enya's "Only Time" included, and a massive television advertising campaign announcing the group's arrival.

Among the instruments used by the women: erhu (Chinese fiddle), pipa (pear-shaped lute), guzheng (zither), yangqin (hammered dulcimer),  dizi (transverse flute), and xiao (vertical flute). Occasionally, the duxianqin (single-stringed zither) and hulusi (three-piped gourd flute) are employed.

Performances 

In July 2003, Beautiful Energy, their first album in Japan, reached the top of the J-pop chart. They won Japan Gold Disc Award in 2004.

The Twelve Girls Band toured in the United States in 2004 Miracles tour  and again in 2005.

On July 7, 2007, the Twelve Girls Band performed at the Chinese leg of Live Earth in Shanghai, and were accompanied by the Mexican folk singer Lila Downs. 

The Italian Soprano Giorgia Fumanti performed with the group in October and November 2007, on their North American tour. The tour traveled to the Midwest, and the East and West Coast areas of the US and Canada.

In 2008, the yang qin player, Ma Jing Jing did concerts playing the yangqin and guzheng.

Members (by instrument)
Erhu (二胡; often referred as a "two-string fiddle")
秦子婧 (Qin Zijing)
上官振楠 (Shangguan Zhennan)
于秋実 (Yu Qiushi)
金晶 (Jin Jing)
羅翩翩 (Luo Pianpian)
Pipa (琵琶; a four-stringed instrument)
石娟 (Shi Juan)
仲宝 (Zhong Bao)
Zhongruan (中阮; a plucked string instrument, a.k.a. "Moon guitar")
臧暁鵬 (Zang Xiaopeng)
Dizi (笛子; a traverse flute)
陳雪嬌 (Chen Xuejiao)
廖彬曲 (Liao Binqu)
Yangqin (扬琴; a hammered dulcimer)
孙莉莉 (Sun Lili)
田超（Tian Chao）
張静 (Zhang Jing)
馬亜晶 (Ma Ya Jing)
Guzheng (古箏; a plucked zither)
于秋璇(Yu Qiuxuan)
Duxianqin (独弦琴/獨弦琴; a one-stringed pucked instrument)
唐小媛(Tang Xiaoyuan)

Discography

Studio albums (original works) 
 Joshi Juni Gakubou - Beautiful Energy (CD and DVD, 2003) - first Japanese album
 Kikou - Shining Energy - (CD and DVD, 2004) - second Japanese album
 Eastern Energy (CD and DVD, 2004) - first USA album
 Tonkou - Romantic Energy - (CD and DVD, 2005)
 Romantic Energy (CD and DVD, 2005) - published in the US
 Shanghai (2007)
 Perfect Best (2010)  (CD) - published in Japan (Last two song introduce Alive2. One of the spinoff groups formed by members of 12 Girls Band)
 Alive2Again (2013) spinoff groups formed by members of 12 Girls Band
 Beautiful and Shining - 15th Anniversary Album (CD 2016) - published in Japan
 Shining Energy (2017)

 Studio albums (tributes and covers) 
 Red Hot Classics (CD, DVD and VCD, 2004)
 Tribute to Wang Luobin (CD and DVD, 2004)
 Merry Christmas To You (2005) - Christmas album published in Japan
 The Best of Covers (2005) - Covers of mostly Japanese songs
 Not so White Christmas (CD and DVD, 2005)
 Twelve Girls of Christmas (2005) - Christmas album published in the US

 Studio albums (compilations) 
 Freedom (Greatest Hits) (2 CDs, 2004)( its origin is An Ottoman Classical Composition composed by Santuri Ethem Efendi. The name of the piece is şehnaz longa)
 The Best of 12 Girls Band (2006) - Korean version available

 Live albums 
 Meili Yinyuehui 魅力音乐会 (CD, 2001 - limited Press) - Original Debut CD
 Kiseki/Miracle Live (CD, DVD and VCD, 2003)
 Twelve Girls Band Live at Budokan Japan 2004 (DVD, 2004)
 Journey to Silk Road (VCD, 2005)

Most of these CDs were released in different versions for in the US, China, Hong Kong and Macau, Japan, Taiwan, the Philippines, and Korea. Please see the official individual album page for information on how the tracklist differs.

References

External links
Official Website
Yahoo Group
Twelve Girls Band Official Site
女子十二乐坊

All-female bands
Chinese musical groups
Chinese musical instrument ensembles
Musical groups established in 2001